Nam Seung-woo (born 18 February 1992) is a South Korean football midfielder who currently plays for Gangwon FC.

External links
 

1992 births
Living people
South Korean footballers
South Korean expatriate sportspeople in Japan
South Korean expatriate sportspeople in Belgium
South Korean expatriate footballers
JEF United Chiba players
A.F.C. Tubize players
Gangwon FC players
J2 League players
Korea National League players
K League 1 players
Expatriate footballers in Japan
Expatriate footballers in Belgium
Association football midfielders